Mao is one of the constituencies in Manipur Legislative Assembly constituencies in Manipur. It had the second-highest number of voters among all the constituencies in Manipur.

It is part of Senapati district and is reserved for candidates belonging to the Scheduled Tribes.

Members of the Legislative Assembly

Election results

2022 result

2017

See also
 List of constituencies of the Manipur Legislative Assembly
 Senapati district

References

External links
 

Senapati district
Assembly constituencies of Manipur